Saigon Broadcasting Television Network, abbreviated SBTN, is a 24-hour Vietnamese language television channel targeted at Vietnamese audiences living outside of Vietnam. Its headquarters are in Garden Grove, California.

The channel provides television programs in the field of Vietnamese history, news, culture, economics, talk shows, children's shows, sitcoms, and games shows. The channel strives to serve as a lifeline for the first and second generations of Vietnamese Americans with news from both the United States and Vietnam, as well as covering educational programming and daily entertainment for the family, such as talk shows, dramas, Asian movies and documentaries; it also aims to help preserve Vietnamese culture for Vietnamese populations living abroad.

SBTN has local affiliates in Boston, Massachusetts (Boston Vietnamese Media), Washington, D.C. (SBTN-DC), Dallas, Texas (SBTN DFW), and Honolulu, Hawaii.

A Canadian version, SBTN Canada, is available in Canada for Vietnamese Canadians, with programming from the United States service, plus content produced in Canada; this service is owned by the Ethnic Channels Group, under license from SBTN.

History
The network was established in 2001 in Orange County, California by Truc Ho, founder and CEO of SBTN who is also a well known songwriter/composer, producer and human rights activist in the Vietnamese community. "It was my intention to help the Vietnamese community unite and form one voice to speak out on issues related to the community.  Together with a few other dedicated partners we raised the funds to launch the channel more than ten years ago."

About
The network is headquartered in Garden Grove, California, which is home of the largest Vietnamese population living outside Vietnam. The majority of SBTN's news, variety and music programming is produced in the Garden Grove facility.

SBTN is distributed by International Media Distribution, a leading provider of in-language and multi-ethnic programming in the United States and launched the network on Time Warner Cable in 2014.  The network is also available throughout the United States, Canada, and Australia on DirecTV,
Comcast,
Cox Communications,
Verizon Fios, 
AT&T U-Verse, and many other video service providers.

Programming
SBTN broadcasts programs such as:

 SBTN Morning with Mai Phi Long and Đỗ Dzũng
 Evening News with Dieu Quyen and Bao Chau / : Information from all points of the globe, from Vietnam to local communities
 SBTN Daily News: Up to the minute news reports.
 The Victoria To Uyen Show: A mix of Hollywood celebrities, local business leaders, scholars, athletes, politicians, and others in a one-on-one interview setting.
 Hollywood First Look Features: An entertainment magazine show that highlights the best of what film and television has to offer.
 A Time to Remember / : A music program featuring Asia Entertainment’s artists.
 Cooking in the Kitchen with Uyen Thi / : Chef and restaurateur Uyen Thy introduces traditional Vietnamese dishes along with contemporary styles of cooking. 
 Music Request with Orchid Lam Quynh / : An entertainment show featuring the best and brightest artists of Vietnamese music in America. The show takes on requests from viewers to dedicate songs to each other nationwide.
 Tuong Thang and Do Phu: weekly discussions of current events from Vietnam to the U.S. as well as global issues from a Vietnamese American perspective.
 Thuy Phan's Phantastic Feast

Management
 Truc Ho, Founder, CEO and President
 Nguyen Do Phu, Vice President and Counsel
 Nguyen Anh Tuan, CFO

Personnel
 Dieu Quyen – Anchor
 Bao Chau – Anchor
 Victoria To Uyen – Show Host & Anchor
 Tuong Thang – Host
 Do Phu – Host
 Kiyra Lynn – Correspondent for SBTN and The Victoria To Uyen Show

References

Television networks in the United States
Vietnamese-American culture in California
Garden Grove, California
Television channels and stations established in 2000
Vietnamese-language television networks in the United States